Saint Æthelflæda of Romsey (born c. 962) was an early Abbess of Romsey Abbey in the reign of King Edgar. Her identity is obscure, though in later stories she was said to be the daughter of a tenth-century nobleman. She has been distinguished from Ælflæda, daughter of Edward the Elder, who was herself connected with the founding of the Abbey.

Life
Æthelflæda appears in a small number of eleventh- and twelfth-century monastic calendars. A 14th-century life of her, amongst a collection of saints lives once belonging to Romsey Abbey, is held in the British Library's Lansdowne manuscripts, MS Lansdowne 436, fols. 43v-45v. According to that account Æthelflæda was the youngest daughter of Ethelwold (died 962), a noble of King Edgar, and either Ethelwold's first wife, Brithwina, or his second, Elfrida. After her father's death, Edgar sent Æthelflæda to be educated by Saint Merwinna at Romsey. 

Several miracles were ascribed to Æthelflæda. After her candle went out at the lectern, light shone from the fingers of her right hand enabling her to read. On another occasion she miraculously saw through a stone wall, discovering that her teacher Merwynna was cutting and hiding switches with which to beat the students. The Queen, to whom she was distantly related, heard of her and invited her to stay. Æthelflæda had a secret habit of naked al fresco bathing and prayer, and on one such occasion was followed by the Queen. The Queen ended up distressed and fitting  in her chamber until quietened by Æthelflæda's prayers.

Æthelflæda succeeded Merwinna's successor Elwina as Abbess of Romsey. She died on 23rd October. Though initially buried unostentatiously in the churchyard, she was subsequently reinterred in the church.

References

Anglo-Saxon abbesses
10th-century English nuns
Benedictine abbesses
960s births
Year of birth uncertain
Year of death unknown